Harbour Beat is a 1990 Scottish-Australian film which marked the directorial debut of David Elfick.

Premise
Glasgow cop Neal McBride teams up with Australian cop Lancelot Cooper.

Production
$1.4 million of the budget came from the Film Finance Corporation.

Release
The film was never released theatrically and debuted directly on television.

References

External links

Australian crime drama films
1990 films
1990 directorial debut films
1990s English-language films
1990s Australian films